Schramm may refer to:

 Schramm (film), a 1993 film about Lothar Schramm, the "lipstick killer"
 Schramm Inc. (founded 1900), a U.S. manufacturer of drilling equipment
 Schramm (surname), people with the surname Schramm

See also
 Schram (disambiguation)
 Schramm Park State Recreation Area, in Sarpy County, Nebraska, U.S.
 113952 Schramm (discovered 2002), a main-belt minor planet
 Schramm–Loewner evolution, a stochastic process in probability theory